Podberezye is the name of several  rural localities in Russia.

Kaluga Oblast
As of 2010, two rural localities in Kaluga Oblast bear this name:
Podberezye, Babyninsky District, Kaluga Oblast, a village in Babyninsky District
Podberezye, Mosalsky District, Kaluga Oblast, a village in Mosalsky District

Leningrad Oblast
As of 2010, one rural locality in Leningrad Oblast bears this name:
Podberezye, Leningrad Oblast, a logging depot settlement in Seleznevskoye Settlement Municipal Formation of Vyborgsky District

Novgorod Oblast
As of 2010, eight rural localities in Novgorod Oblast bear this name:
Podberezye (railway station), Podberezskoye Settlement, Novgorodsky District, Novgorod Oblast, a railway station in Podberezskoye Settlement of Novgorodsky District
Podberezye (village), Podberezskoye Settlement, Novgorodsky District, Novgorod Oblast, a village in Podberezskoye Settlement of Novgorodsky District
Podberezye, Batetsky District, Novgorod Oblast, a village in Peredolskoye Settlement of Batetsky District
Podberezye, Kholmsky District, Novgorod Oblast, a village in Morkhovskoye Settlement of Kholmsky District
Podberezye, Lyubytinsky District, Novgorod Oblast, a village under the administrative jurisdiction of the urban-type settlement of Nebolchi in Lyubytinsky District
Podberezye, Moshenskoy District, Novgorod Oblast, a village in Kirovskoye Settlement of Moshenskoy District
Podberezye, Okulovsky District, Novgorod Oblast, a village under the administrative jurisdiction of the urban-type settlement of Kulotino in Okulovsky District
Podberezye, Soletsky District, Novgorod Oblast, a village in Vybitskoye Settlement of Soletsky District

Pskov Oblast
As of 2010, four rural localities in Pskov Oblast bear this name:
Podberezye, Loknyansky District, Pskov Oblast, a selo in Loknyansky District
Podberezye, Ostrovsky District, Pskov Oblast, a village in Ostrovsky District
Podberezye, Pskovsky District, Pskov Oblast, a village in Pskovsky District
Podberezye, Velikoluksky District, Pskov Oblast, a village in Velikoluksky District

Smolensk Oblast
As of 2010, two rural localities in Smolensk Oblast bear this name:
Podberezye, Krasninsky District, Smolensk Oblast, a village in Neykovskoye Rural Settlement of Krasninsky District
Podberezye, Sychyovsky District, Smolensk Oblast, a village in Subbotnikovskoye Rural Settlement of Sychyovsky District

Tver Oblast
As of 2010, seven rural localities in Tver Oblast bear this name:
Podberezye, Andreapolsky District, Tver Oblast, a village in Toropatskoye Rural Settlement of Andreapolsky District
Podberezye, Nelidovsky District, Tver Oblast, a village in Zemtsovskoye Rural Settlement of Nelidovsky District
Podberezye, Pestrikovskoye Rural Settlement, Kashinsky District, Tver Oblast, a village in Pestrikovskoye Rural Settlement of Kashinsky District
Podberezye, Sandovsky District, Tver Oblast, a village in Sobolinskoye Rural Settlement of Sandovsky District
Podberezye, Selizharovsky District, Tver Oblast, a village in Dmitrovskoye Rural Settlement of Selizharovsky District
Podberezye, Slavkovskoye Rural Settlement, Kashinsky District, Tver Oblast, a village in Slavkovskoye Rural Settlement of Kashinsky District
Podberezye, Vyshnevolotsky District, Tver Oblast, a village in Luzhnikovskoye Rural Settlement of Vyshnevolotsky District

Vladimir Oblast
As of 2010, one rural locality in Vladimir Oblast bears this name:
Podberezye, Vladimir Oblast, a selo in Suzdalsky District

Vologda Oblast
As of 2010, two rural localities in Vologda Oblast bear this name:
Podberezye, Velikoustyugsky District, Vologda Oblast, a village in Shemogodsky Selsoviet of Velikoustyugsky District
Podberezye, Vologodsky District, Vologda Oblast, a village in Bereznikovsky Selsoviet of Vologodsky District

Yaroslavl Oblast
As of 2010, three rural localities in Yaroslavl Oblast bear this name:
Podberezye, Pereslavsky District, Yaroslavl Oblast, a village in Perelessky Rural Okrug of Pereslavsky District
Podberezye, Rostovsky District, Yaroslavl Oblast, a village in Shugorsky Rural Okrug of Rostovsky District
Podberezye, Uglichsky District, Yaroslavl Oblast, a village in Uleyminsky Rural Okrug of Uglichsky District